Dagobert David Runes (January 6, 1902 – September 24, 1982) was a philosopher and author.

Biography
Born in Zastavna, Bukovina, Austro-Hungary (now in Ukraine), Runes emigrated to the United States in 1926.  He had received a doctorate in philosophy from the University of Vienna in 1924.  In the U.S. he became editor of The Modern Thinker and later Current Digest. From 1931 to 1934 he was Director of the Institute for Advanced Education in New York City. He had an encyclopedic level fluency in Latin and Biblical Hebrew; he fluently spoke and wrote in Austrian German, German, Yiddish, French, Hebrew, Russian, Polish, Czechoslovakian, and English. In 1941 he founded the Philosophical Library,  a spiritual organization and publishing house. Runes was a colleague and friend to Albert Einstein.

Runes published an English translation of Marx's On the Jewish Question under the title A World without Jews. Though this has often been considered the first translation of the work, a Soviet anti-zionist, propaganda version had existed a few years earlier, which was likely unknown to Runes.  As the title of Rune's book sounded antisemitic, it had extremely limited circulation in the English-speaking world. Runes wrote an introduction to the translation that was clearly antagonistic to extreme Marxism, and 'its materialism,' as he would later often put it, yet he did not entirely negate Marxism. He also edited several works presenting the ideas and history of philosophy to a general audience, especially his Dictionary of Philosophy.

Selected works 
Der wahre Jesus oder das fünfte Evangelium R. Cerny, 1927.
Dictionary of Philosophy (editor) Philosophical Library, 1942.
The Selected Writings of Benjamin Rush (editor) Philosophical Library, 1947.
Jordan Lieder: Frühe Gedichte (in German) The Philosophical Library, 1948.
Letters to My Son The Philosophical Library, 1949.
The Hebrew Impact on Western Civilization The Philosophical Library, 1951.
Spinoza Dictionary The Philosophical Library, 1951.
Of God, the Devil and the Jews The Philosophical Library, 1952.
The Soviet Impact on Society: A Recollection, 1953.
Letters to My Daughter The Philosophical Library, 1954.
Treasury of Philosophy (editor) The Philosophical Library, 1955.
Treasury of World Literature (editor) The Philosophical Library, 1956.
On the Nature of Man The Philosophical Library, 1956.
 Sartre, J.P., Being and Nothingness Translated by Hazel E. Barnes, The Philosophical Library, 1956. 
Pictorial History of Philosophy (editor) The Philosophical Library, 1959.
A Dictionary of Thought (editor) Philosophical Library, 1959.
A World without Jews (translator) The Philosophical Library, 1959.
The Art of Thinking The Philosophical Library, 1961.
A Treasury of World Science (editor) The Philosophical Library, 1962.
Despotism: A Pictorial History of Tyranny (author) The Philosophical Library, 1963 Library of Congress Card catalog #62-22269
The Disinterested and the Law The Philosophical Library, 1964.
Philosophy for Everyman: From Socrates to Sartre, Philosophical Library, Library of Congress Card #68-22351, ©1968.

References

Sources 
Ulrich E Bach. “Dagobert D. Runes: Ein streitbarer Verleger in New York.”  In: Deutschsprachige Exilliteratur seit 1933 3/I USA Supplement. Ed. John M. Spalek, Konrad Feilchenfeldt and Sandra H. Hawrylchak. Berlin: De Gruyter, 2010: 278-295.
Pictorial History of Philosophy by Dagobert D. Runes, 1959.
Karl Marx: Selected essays.” 1926

External links 
 
Dictionary of Philosophy
Correspondence with Einstein

1902 births
1982 deaths
People from Chernivtsi Oblast
20th-century American philosophers
Yiddish-speaking people
Jewish American writers
Jewish socialists
Ukrainian Jews
American people of Ukrainian-Jewish descent